Mairaj Ahmed Khan (born 2 November 1975, in Khurja) is an Indian skeet shooter and two-time Olympian. Khan was the first Indian skeet shooter to qualify for the Olympics when he qualified for the Rio Olympics in 2015; he also competed in the Tokyo Olympics in 2021. He has won gold at the ISSF World Shooting Championships, the
Commonwealth Shooting Championships, and the Asian Shooting Championships. In 2021, Sportstar reported that Khan was ranked #24 in the world in skeet.

Early life
Khan was born on 2 November 1975 to Ilyas Ahmed and his wife in Khurja, Bulandshahr, Uttar Pradesh, India. The family are affluent Kheshgi and Sunni Muslims. Khan's father, uncles, and brother Najam were all state-level trap shooters but none of them pursued it professionally. Khan has two other siblings, Siraj and Farheen.

As a child, Khan was very interested in cricket and played as a top order batsman. He was eventually named skipper of Uttar Pradesh's U-19 team in the 1990s. At age 10, he placed third in a U-12 50-metre rifle competition and used his prize money to buy a cricket bat. He eventually decided not to pursue cricket professionally and instead turned to skeet shooting after college. Khan also has a Masters degree.

Career
Khan's first international competition was the 2003 ISSF World Cup in Lonato, Italy. He has participated in a number of regional, national, and world competitions, including the ISSF World Shooting Championships, (2000, 2003, 2005-2011, 2013-2016, 2021) Commonwealth Shooting Championships (2010), Commonwealth Games (2010, 2014), Asian Games (2006, 2010, 2014), Asian Shooting Championships (2004, 2007-2009, 2011-2014, 2016-2017, 2019), and the South Asian Federation Shooting Championship (2009).

In 2016, Khan became the first ever Indian skeet shooter to qualify for the Olympics. At the Rio Olympics, he finished in 9th place. He also qualified for the Tokyo Olympics and finished 25th. In 2022 in Changwon, South Korea, he became the first Indian skeet shooter to win a gold medal at the ISSF World Cup. This came as a surprise to Khan, who almost quit shooting after his father's 2021 death.

His coaches throughout his career have included Andrea Benelli, Sunny Thomas, Ennio Falco, and Riccardo Filippelli. Khan also runs an NGO called MAK Shooting Foundation, which trains future shooting talent. He coached Angad Vir Singh Bajwa.

Medals

References

Skeet shooters
Indian male sport shooters
1975 births
Living people
Shooters at the 2006 Asian Games
Shooters at the 2010 Asian Games
Shooters at the 2014 Asian Games
Shooters at the 2016 Summer Olympics
Olympic shooters of India
Asian Games competitors for India
Shooters at the 2020 Summer Olympics